First Minister of England may refer to:

 The chief minister of England, under the King or Queen of England from 946 to 1707. 
 The office of the Prime Minister of the United Kingdom, sometimes referred to as that of First Minister of England due to Devolution in the UK.